Doug Campbell was a rock and roll guitarist from Nebraska, and the recipient of the 2000 Ron Tuccitto Award from the Nebraska Music Hall of Fame.

See also
Music of Nebraska

References

External links
THE RON TUCCITTO AWARD

Musicians from Nebraska
Year of birth missing (living people)
Living people
Place of birth missing (living people)
American male guitarists